Dichomeris melanortha is a moth in the family Gelechiidae. It was described by Edward Meyrick in 1929. It is found in southern India.

The forewings are dark grey, somewhat sprinkled with blackish and whitish, especially on the veins posteriorly. The costal edge from the base to beyond the middle is blackish, with about eight oblique cloudy whitish strigulae and a blackish streak along the fold from near the base to the middle of the wing, and another from before the middle of the disc to the apex. The hindwings are grey, subhyaline (almost glass like) and tinged with violet blue in the disc and towards the base.

References

Moths described in 1929
melanortha